Chinda is a municipality in the Honduran department of Santa Bárbara.

Demographics
At the time of the 2013 Honduras census, Chinda municipality had a population of 4,702. Of these, 95.49% were Mestizo, 4.13% Indigenous (4.06% Lenca), 0.19% White and 0.19% Black or Afro-Honduran.

References

Municipalities of the Santa Bárbara Department, Honduras